The 2017 PSA Men's World Squash Championship is the men's edition of the 2017 World Squash Championships, which serves as the individual world championship for squash players. The event took place in Manchester, England from 8 to 17 December 2017.

Mohamed El Shorbagy won his first World Championship title, defeating his brother Marwan El Shorbagy in the final.

Prize money and ranking points
For 2017, the prize purse was $325,000. The prize money and points breakdown is as follows:

Seeds

Draw and results

Finals

Top half

Section 1

Section 2

Bottom half

Section 1

Section 2

See also
World Championship
2017 Women's World Squash Championship

References

External links
 PSA World Championship page

World Squash Championships
M
Squash tournaments in the United Kingdom
International sports competitions hosted by England
2017 in English sport
Sports competitions in Manchester
Men's World Open Squash